Makwa (also spelled Makwia) is a town in Sokoto State, Nigeria.

References

Populated places in Sokoto State